The Wilhelmi Formation is a geologic formation in Illinois. It preserves fossils dating back to the Silurian period.

See also

 List of fossiliferous stratigraphic units in Illinois

References
 

Silurian Illinois
Silurian southern paleotropical deposits